Indohyaenodontidae ("indian Hyaenodonts") is a family of extinct predatory mammals from extinct order Hyaenodonta. Fossil remains of these mammals are known from early to late Eocene deposits in Asia.

Classification and phylogeny

Taxonomy
 Family: †Indohyaenodontidae 
 Genus: †Indohyaenodon 
 †Indohyaenodon raoi 
 Genus: †Yarshea 
 †Yarshea cruenta

Phylogeny 
The phylogenetic relationships of family Indohyaenodontidae are shown in the following cladogram:

See also
 Mammal classification
 Hyaenodonta

References

Hyaenodonts
Paleogene mammals of Asia
Prehistoric mammal families